The 2020–21 Pau FC season was the club's 101st season in existence and the first season back in the second flight of French football. In addition to the domestic league, Pau participated in this season's edition of the Coupe de France. The season covered the period from 1 July 2020 to 30 June 2021.

Players

First-team squad

Transfers

In

Out

Pre-season and friendlies

Competitions

Overview

Ligue 2

League table

Results summary

Results by round

Matches
The league fixtures were announced on 9 July 2020.

Coupe de France

Statistics

Goalscorers

References

External links

Pau FC seasons
Pau FC